Archibald John "A.J." McArthur (February 21, 1857 – June 5, 1911) was a Canadian politician.

Early life
Archibald moved to Calgary in 1887. He was active in the community, founding the Calgary neighborhood of Crescent Heights. He served on the YMCA board of directors in Calgary, and became Deacon of the First Baptist Church.

Archibald used his community involvement to help win a bitter by-election for the Alberta Liberal Party on October 3, 1910, for a seat in the 2nd Alberta Legislature against well known incumbent and Calgary rancher Ezra Riley. McArthur died a year later in 1911 vacating his seat in the Alberta Legislature. His brother John Peter McArthur ran for the Liberals in Archibald's place, and faced Ezra Riley's brother Harold Riley in the brothers by-election.

References

External links
Legislative Assembly of Alberta Members Listing
Archibald John McArthur biography Pioneer Profiles

Alberta Liberal Party MLAs
1857 births
1911 deaths